Ocinebrina edwardsii is a species of sea snail, a marine gastropod mollusk in the family Muricidae, the murex snails or rock snails.

Description
The shell size varies between 12 mm and  20 mm.

Distribution
This species is distributed in European waters and in the Mediterranean Sea along Greece and Apulia, Italy; in the Atlantic Ocean along western Africa.

References

 Gofas, S.; Le Renard, J.; Bouchet, P. (2001). Mollusca, in: Costello, M.J. et al. (Ed.) (2001). European register of marine species: a check-list of the marine species in Europe and a bibliography of guides to their identification. Collection Patrimoines Naturels, 50: pp. 180–213

External links
 

Gastropods described in 1826
Ocenebra